Chondropsis is a genus of sponges belonging to the family Chondropsidae.

The species of this genus are found in Southern Africa, Malesia, Australia.

Species:

Chondropsis arenacea 
Chondropsis arenifera 
Chondropsis australis 
Chondropsis ceratosus 
Chondropsis chaliniformis
Chondropsis columnifera 
Chondropsis confoederata 
Chondropsis isimangaliso 
Chondropsis kirkii 
Chondropsis lamella 
Chondropsis macropsamma 
Chondropsis subtilis 
Chondropsis topsenti 
Chondropsis wilsoni

References

Poecilosclerida
Sponge genera